Corning High School may refer to:

 Corning High School (Arkansas) - located in Corning, Arkansas.
 Corning High School (California) - located in Corning, California.
 Corning High School (Iowa) - located in Corning, Iowa.